Savarabad (also Romanized as Savārābād; also known as Savārābād-e Gūt-e Kalāt) is a village in Abezhdan Rural District, Abezhdan District, Andika County, Khuzestan Province, Iran. At the 2006 census, its population was 43, in 5 families.

References 

Populated places in Andika County